Midleton (meaning "monastery at the weir") is a town in south-eastern County Cork, Ireland. It lies approximately 16 km east of Cork City on the Owenacurra River and the N25 road, which connects Cork to the port of Rosslare. A satellite town of Cork City, Midleton is part of Metropolitan Cork. It is the central hub of business for the East Cork Area. Midleton is within the Cork East Dáil constituency.

History
In the 1180s advancing Normans led by Barry Fitz Gerald established an abbey at a weir on the river to be populated by Cistercian Monks from Burgundy. The abbey became known as "Chore Abbey" and "Castrum Chor", taking its name from the Irish word  (weir), although some say that "Chor" comes from "Choir" or "Choral". The abbey is commemorated in the Irish name for Midleton, or "Monastery at the Weir", and of the local river Owenacurra or  meaning "River of the Weirs". St John the Baptist's Church, belonging to the Church of Ireland was erected in 1825 and today still stands on the site of the abbey.

Captain Walter Raleigh (later Sir Walter) had an association with Midleton, living for periods in nearby Youghal between 1585 and 1602. His presence came about due to a distribution of land in reward for helping suppress the Second Desmond Rebellion of 1579–1583. As part of this suppression, he was ordered to seize Barry's Castle at nearby Cahermore. The Desmond FitzGerald Seneschal, or steward of Imokilly, on being expelled from the castle, took refuge in the Abbey, but was again forced to flee by Raleigh.

Raleigh is credited with planting the first potatoes in Europe, also at Youghal.

The town gained the name Midleton or "Middle Town" as the main midway town, 10 miles between Cork and Youghal. It was incorporated as a market town and postal depot in 1670, receiving its charter from Charles II, as the "borough and town of Midleton". Later it would become a post town of the Great Southern and Western Railway.

Alan Brodrick, Speaker of the Irish House of Commons and Lord Chancellor of Ireland was made the first Baron and Viscount Midleton in 1715 and 1717, respectively.  He is commemorated by Broderick St in the town.

The town is home to the Old Midleton Distillery which was established by James Murphy in 1825. The distillery operated independently until 1868, when it became part of the Cork Distilleries Company, which was later amalgamated into Irish Distillers in 1967. In 1988, Irish Distillers was the subject of a friendly takeover by the French drinks conglomerate Pernod Ricard. The Old Midleton Distillery, which boasts the world's largest pot still – a copper vessel with a capacity of 140,000 litres, was in operation until 1975 when production was transferred to a new purpose-built facility, the New Midleton Distillery. The New Midleton Distillery produces a number of Irish whiskeys, including Jameson Whiskey, Redbreast, and Paddy. It also produces vodka and gin. In 1992, the old distillery was restored and reopened as a visitor centre. Known as the Jameson Experience, the visitor centre hosts a number of attractions, including Ireland's largest working water-wheel (with a diameter of 7m).

At the top of the main street stands a monument to 16 Irish Republican Army men killed on 20 February 1921 during the Irish War of Independence. Twelve IRA personnel were killed during an unsuccessful ambush of British forces at the nearby town of Clonmult, while four more were captured and two of those later executed. The incident was the biggest single loss of life for the IRA during the war. 'Captain' Sean O'Shea led the Clonmult gang and is buried as head of the Republican Plot at Midleton cemetery. Nearby stands a monument marking the 200th anniversary of the Irish Rebellion of 1798.

Two houses designed by Augustus Pugin, later the architect of the Houses of Parliament in London, stand at the bottom of Main Street. They now form one building and house a public bar.

In 2015, a large steel sculpture called Kindred Spirits was installed in Bailick Park. This sculpture commemorates a famine relief donation, made in 1847 by Native American Choctaw people, during the Great Famine.

Education

Elizabeth Villiers, former mistress of William of Orange, founded the private school named Midleton College in 1696.  The school is traditionally associated with the Church of Ireland. Past pupils include Isaac Butt, founder of the Home Rule League, Reginald Dyer, perpetrator of the Amritsar Massacre and John Philpot Curran, lawyer and father of Sarah Curran.

Economy
Local employers include retail, light manufacturing, food production, tourism and whiskey distilling industries. At nearby Whitegate is the state's first gas-fired power station as well as Ireland's only oil refinery. Many Midleton residents also commute to jobs in Cork city, Carrigtwohill or Little Island.

Traditionally the main commercial and retail area of the town was on Main Street and this continues to provide shopping – primarily with local ownership. The commercial part of Midleton has also expanded to the old site of Midleton Mart, now called Market Green. A number of multinational retailers have outlets in Midleton, including Tesco, Lidl, Boots, and Aldi. The Market Green shopping centre is located at the northern end of the town. This includes a five-screen cinema, Tesco and other stores and the Midleton Park Hotel is just across the road. A locally owned supermarket, Hurley's Super-Valu, is also located at the northern end of the town opposite the so-called 'Gooses Acre'. On Saturdays the park next to SuperValu is the site for the Midleton Farmers' Market. Lidl, Aldi and McDonald's are located in a new shopping and residential area alongside the river.

Midleton is also the home of the Old Midleton Distillery, a tourist attraction which includes the largest pot-still in the world.

Geography
The town is located in a fertile valley below hills to the north with Cork Harbour and the coast to the south. In times past, the channel from the Harbour to nearby Ballinacurra (meaning "Town at the Weir"), was navigable by barges up to 300 tonnes. Due to silting over the years, the channel is now extremely shallow.

Demographics
In the 20 years between the 1996 and 2016 census, the population of the Midleton area effectively doubled, from 6,209 to 12,496 people.

As of the 2016 census, of Midleton's 12,496 inhabitants, 72% were white Irish, less than 1% white Irish travellers, 17% other white ethnicities, 4% black, 1% Asian, 1% other ethnicities, and 4% did not state their ethnicity. In terms of religion the area was 77% Catholic, 9% other stated religions, 11% with no religion, and 3% not stated.

Transport

Rail

Midleton railway station is on the Cork Suburban Rail network and is one of two termini (the other being Cobh) into and out of Cork Kent railway station. Passengers interchange at Cork Kent for trains to Dublin and Tralee.

The railway line to Midleton was opened on 10 November 1859 by the Cork & Youghal Railway, a company that was later taken over by the Great Southern & Western Railway. Midleton was the location of the railway works for this company.

The line between Midleton and Cork was closed for regular use between 1963 and 2009. Occasional use (mainly transport of beet from Midleton to the Mallow Sugar Factory) continued for many years after 1963, but even the sporadic usage of the line came to an end in 1988, with the final train to use the track being a passenger excursion for Midleton GAA supporters to Dublin for the final of the All Ireland Senior Club Hurling Championship (in which Midleton played). The reopening of the line was completed by Iarnród Éireann on 30 July 2009.

Air
The nearest airport is Cork Airport.

Bus
Bus Éireann run bus services to and from Midleton, including to Cork City Bus Station, Whitegate, Waterford, Ballinacurra, Carrigtwohill, Little Island, Glounthaune and Tivoli.

Sport
Midleton GAA is the local Gaelic Athletic Association club, and Midleton RFC the local rugby club. Martial arts groups include the Midleton Aikido Club [which has been teaching Aikido in East Cork since 2006] and Midleton Taekwondo Club. Midleton F.C. is the local soccer team, and there is also a cricket club.

Notable people
 Richard Bettesworth, lawyer and politician
 Edward Bransfield, reputed (disputed) discoverer of Antarctica, was born in Ballinacurra near Midleton
 Alan Brodrick, lawyer and politician
 Tom Horan, Australian cricketer
 James Martin, Australian politician and judge
 Colm O'Neill, Gaelic footballer
 Shane O'Neill, professional soccer player
 David Stanton, politician
 Nora Twomey, Academy Award nominated director and animator
 Elizabeth Villiers, English-born courtier who founded Midleton College

See also
 List of abbeys and priories in Ireland (County Cork)
 List of towns and villages in Ireland
 Market Houses in Ireland
 Midleton (Parliament of Ireland constituency)
 Midleton Very Rare

References

External links

 Midleton Chamber of Commerce website

 
Towns and villages in County Cork
Civil parishes of County Cork